Up and Away is the sixth album by the rock band The Kingsmen, released in 1966.

Release and reception

The Kingsmen's sixth album represented a departure from previous efforts with new producers and a revamped line-up.  Barry Curtis had been drafted and Norm Sundholm left to manage his Sunn amplifiers business.  Their respective replacements were J.C. Rieck on keyboards with Kerry Magness and then Pete Borg on bass.  Also new to the team were producers Paul Tannen and Mark Wildey.

The track list features a combination of reliable pop and R&B standards mixed with songs written by group members.  This was the first Kingsmen album not to make the Billboard LP chart
—an indication of the group's waning popularity as musical tastes changed in the mid-60s.

The January 7, 1967 issue of Billboard Magazine reviewed the album:
The "Louie Louie" group has come up with a change of pace package loaded with excitement. They run the gauntlet from the folk-oriented "If I Needed Someone" and "Grass Is Green" to hard rockers "Mustang Sally" and "Shake A Tail Feather." The well balanced and well loaded (14 selections) album can't miss.

Both mono (WDM 675) and stereo (WDS 675) versions were released.  International releases included Canada (Wand 675C) and United Kingdom (Wand WNS 6, different cover). The album was reissued on CD by Sundazed and Bear Family in 1994 with bonus track "Killer Joe".

Track listing
 Trouble – 2:20 (A. Resnick-J. Levine)
 If I Needed Someone – 2:47 (G. Harrison)
 Grass Is Green – 2:18 (D. Peterson-M. Mitchell)
 Tossin' and Turnin' – 2:40 (R. Adams-M. Rene)
 Under My Thumb – 3:02 (Jagger/Richards)
 Wild Thing – 2:38 (Chip Taylor)
 (I Have Found) Another Girl – 2:18 (B. Curtis-D. Peterson)
 Daytime Shadows – 2:14 (L. Easton-P. Tannen-M. Wildey)
 Shake a Tail Feather – 2:13 (O. Hayes-Andre Williams-Verlie Rice)
 Children's Caretaker – 1:31 (Dick Peterson)
 Land of a Thousand Dances – 2:47  (C. Kenner-Fats Domino)
 Mustang Sally – 2:25 (Bonny Rice)
 Little Sally Tease – 2:50 (Jim Valley)
 Hush-a-Bye – 3:25 (D. Pomus-M. Shuman)
 Killer Joe† – 2:18 (Russell-Elgin-Medley)

† CD bonus track.

Musicians and production
Lynn Easton: vocals, saxophone
Mike Mitchell: lead guitar, vocals
Dick Peterson:  drums
J.C. Rieck: keyboards, vocals
Pete Borg: bass guitar
Producers:  Paul Tannen & Mark Wildey
Liner notes:  Mel Shayne (Manager)
Cover design:  Burt Goldblatt
CD producer:  Bob Irwin

References

1966 albums
The Kingsmen albums